Jacqueline I. Lillie (born 1941) is a French artist and jeweller working in glass. Her work is held in the permanent collection of the Metropolitan Museum of Art in New York City, USA, the Corning Museum of Glass in New York, USA and the National Gallery of Australia.

Biography 
Lillie was born in Marseille, France, to immigrant Austrian parents. She studied metalwork with Professor Hagenauer at the Academy of Applied Arts in Vienna, Austria.

References

Living people
1941 births
French glass artists
20th-century French artists
Artists from Marseille